Lieutenant General Valdas Tutkus (born 27 December 1960) is a former Chief of Defence of Lithuania.  He served in this position from 30 June 2004 to 3 July 2009.

Biography 
From 1978 to 1982, he studied at the Tashkent Higher All-Arms Command School. After 1982, he became a platoon commander. and in 1983 was sent to Afghanistan as part of units of the Turkestan Military District's 40th Army. From 1988 to 1991, he studied at the Frunze Military Academy in Moscow. By 1991, Tutkus withdrew from the Soviet Armed Forces and became a founding member of the modern Lithuanian Armed Forces.

After the restoration of independence, he served in the 'Iron Wolf' Mechanised Infantry Brigade. In 1995, he was sent to the NATO Defense College in Rome. From 1999 to 2001, he served as Military Representative of the Republic of Lithuania to NATO and the European Union. This was concurrent to the post of Defense Attaché to the Kingdom of Belgium. From 2001 to 2004   he was  Commander of the Lithuanian Land Forces.  At the end of his term, he became Commander of the Lithuanian Armed Forces. On 24 July 2009, Arvydas Pocius was assigned as Chief of Defence and Tutkus was dismissed. From 2014 to 2015, he was Director of the Lithuanian Defense and Security Industry Association.

Personal life 
He is married to Lilija, and has a son named Vytautas.

Awards 

 Nominal Weapon (2001)
 Order of the Cross of Vytis
Cross of the Officer of Vytautas the Great Order
 Commemorative Badge of Russian Army withdrawal from Lithuania
 Medal of Merit of National Defence System

References 

Lithuanian generals
Recipients of the Order of the Cross of Vytis
Frunze Military Academy alumni
Tashkent Higher All-Arms Command School alumni
1960 births
Living people
People from Vilnius
NATO Defense College alumni